Fern Cottage is a Grade II listed building in the English village of Port Isaac, Cornwall. Situated on the south side of the harbour, its address is 4 Roscarrock Hill. It is recognisable as the exterior view of the home and surgery of Doctor Martin Ellingham in the ITV television series Doc Martin; interior shots were filmed inside a nearby barn.

The cottage was placed on the list of historic buildings in 1987. Built in the mid-to-late 19th century, its materials are stone rubble with brick dressing. It has a slate roof.

Gallery

References

External links

 Inside Doc Martin’s House - South Coast Detecting, YouTube
 
Buildings and structures in Port Isaac
Grade II listed buildings in Cornwall
Grade II listed houses
Houses completed in the 19th century
Houses in Cornwall